Douglas Russell Cole (born 1964) is a United States district judge of the United States District Court for the Southern District of Ohio.

Education 

Cole earned his Bachelor of Arts from Ripon College; his Bachelor of Engineering, with honors, from the University of Wisconsin; and his Juris Doctor, with high honors, from the University of Chicago Law School.

Legal and academic career 

Upon graduation from law school, Cole served as a law clerk to Judge Frank H. Easterbrook of the United States Court of Appeals for the Seventh Circuit. From 2002 to 2006, he served as Solicitor General of Ohio in the Office of the Ohio Attorney General. In that role, he briefed and argued cases in front of the Supreme Court of the United States, the Ohio Supreme Court, and the United States Court of Appeals for the Sixth Circuit on behalf of the state of Ohio. From 2000 to 2003, Cole was a professor at the Ohio State University Moritz College of Law, where he taught courses in corporations, contracts, and law and economics.

From 2006 to 2019, he was a partner at Organ Cole LLP in Columbus, Ohio, where he represented clients in complex litigation and intellectual property matters.

Federal judicial service 

On May 3, 2019, President Donald Trump announced his intent to nominate Cole to serve as a United States district judge of the United States District Court for the Southern District of Ohio. On May 13, 2019, President Trump nominated Cole to the seat vacated by Judge Susan J. Dlott, who assumed senior status on May 31, 2018. On June 26, 2019, a hearing on his nomination was held before the Senate Judiciary Committee. On July 18, 2019, his nomination was reported out of committee by a 16–6 vote. On December 3, 2019, the United States Senate invoked cloture on his nomination by a 62–29 vote. On December 4, 2019, his nomination was confirmed by a 63–30 vote. He received his judicial commission on December 5, 2019.

References

External links 
 
 Appearances at the U.S. Supreme Court from the Oyez Project

1964 births
Living people
20th-century American lawyers
21st-century American lawyers
21st-century American judges
Judges of the United States District Court for the Southern District of Ohio
Ohio lawyers
Ohio State University faculty
People from Janesville, Wisconsin
Ripon College (Wisconsin) alumni
Solicitors General of Ohio
United States district court judges appointed by Donald Trump
University of Wisconsin–Madison College of Engineering alumni
University of Chicago Law School alumni